Haim Uliel (born 22 December 1956) is an Israeli singer and musician.  Uliel is part of a movement that blends traditional Moroccan music with contemporary rock.

Uliel was born in Sderot and was the leader of the band Sfatayim.

Ulliel is regarded as the central figure in the fusion of Moroccan music with contemporary rock that emerged from Sderot in the nineties.

In 2000, Uliel released his debut album Sanduk La'ajiv (Maghrebi Arabic for "magic box").

References

1956 births
Living people
21st-century Israeli male singers
Israeli people of Moroccan-Jewish descent
Israeli pop singers
People from Sderot